Kateryna Lutsenko (born September 18, 1995 in Dnipropetrovsk, Ukraine) is a Ukrainian individual rhythmic gymnast. She is the 2017 Grand Prix Final All-around bronze medalist.

Career 
Lutsenko has been member of the Ukrainian National Team since 2015.

In 2017, she competed at the Holon Senior International tournament winning bronze in the all-around. Lutsenko competed at the 2017 World Cup series in Guadalajara finishing 20th in all-around, in Berlin finishing 22nd in the all-around and in Minsk, finishing 15th in all-around and qualified in the hoop final. On August 27–29, Lutsenko competed at the 2017 Summer Universiade finishing 4th in all-around behind Hanna Bazhko, in the apparatus finals: Lutsenko won silver in clubs, bronze in hoop, finished 6th in ball and 8th in ribbon. On November 5–6, Lutsenko competed at the 2017 Dalia Kutkaite Cup finishing 8th in the all-around.

References

External links

 
 

1995 births
Living people
Ukrainian rhythmic gymnasts
Sportspeople from Dnipro
Universiade medalists in gymnastics
Universiade silver medalists for Ukraine
Universiade bronze medalists for Ukraine
Medalists at the 2017 Summer Universiade
21st-century Ukrainian women